Fernando Teixeira is an engineer at Ohio State University, Columbus. He was named a Fellow of the Institute of Electrical and Electronics Engineers (IEEE) in 2015 for his contributions to time-domain electromagnetic techniques and applications.

References

Fellow Members of the IEEE
Living people
Year of birth missing (living people)
Place of birth missing (living people)
Ohio State University faculty